Isiekenesi, is a community in Ideato South Local Government Area of Imo State, Nigeria.

Infrastructure
By 2009, poor access roads was identified as one of the key constraints militating against optimal performance in informal economic activities amongst rural women of Isiekenesi, Dikenafai, Mgbidi, Nkwerre, Amiri, Otulu and other communities in Orlu senatorial zone of Imo State. Other problems identified included electricity, portable water and lack of credit facilities to small markets. Land tenure problems were also identified as one of the greatest factors that hindered development of large-scale farming in the zone.

References

Towns in Imo State